The 2015 FC Atyrau season is the 15th successive season that the club will play in the Kazakhstan Premier League, the highest tier of association football in Kazakhstan.

Squad

Reserve team

Transfers

Winter

In:

Out:

Summer

In:

Out:

Competitions

Kazakhstan Premier League

First round

Results summary

Results by round

Results

League table

Championship round

Results summary

Results by round

Results

League table

Kazakhstan Cup

Squad statistics

Appearances and goals

|-
|colspan="14"|Players away from Atyrau on loan:
|-
|colspan="14"|Players who appeared for Atyrau that left during the season:

|}

Goal scorers

Disciplinary record

References

External links
 Official Site

Atyrau
FC Atyrau seasons